Captain Cook Cruises may refer to:

Captain Cook Cruises, Australia - cruise operator in New South Wales, Queensland and South Australia
Captain Cook Cruises Western Australia - ferry operator in Western Australia